Dana Jacobson (born November 5, 1971) is a host and correspondent for CBS News currently serving as a co host for CBS Saturday Morning. She is also an anchor & reporter for CBS Sports and CBS Sports Network.  She joined CBS News in 2015, 2 years after she began working for CBS Sports Network.  Prior to that Jacobson spent a decade at ESPN, from 2002 until 2012.  In March 2005, she was named co-host of Cold Pizza and transitioned with the show as it became First Take. On December 30, 2011, she left First Take and returned to anchoring SportsCenter.  On March 27, 2012, USA Today announced that Jacobson would leave ESPN when her contract expires at the end of April.  Monday, April 30, 2012, was her final day at ESPN when she anchored the 6–8 p.m. ET SportsCenter.

On July 13, 2018, Jacobson, along with long-time CBS correspondent Michelle Miller, were named the new co-hosts of the Saturday edition of CBS This Morning.

Early life and career 
Jacobson was born and raised in the suburbs of Detroit, Michigan, in a Jewish family and attended Andover High School in Bloomfield Hills, Michigan. Subsequently, she attended and graduated from Valley High School in West Des Moines, Iowa, in 1989. Jacobson graduated from the University of Michigan in 1993 with a Bachelor of Arts in English and communications and was a member of the Pi Beta Phi sorority.

Her first television job was in Traverse City, Michigan, at WPBN/WTOM-TV, where she spent two years as a fill-in news anchor and weekend sports anchor, producer, and editor.
Reported on a number of stories in Northern California, including profiles of one time Sacramento Kings players Mike Bibby, Chris Webber, and Jason Williams.
Covered a wide range of professional sports including the NFL and NBA as a weekend sports anchor at KXTV-TV, ABC’s Sacramento affiliate station (1998-02).
Hosted KXTV’s News10 Red Zone
Served as a sports reporter for KXTV's Monday Night Football show (1996–98).
Hosted The NBA Insiders, a weekly two-hour radio show for KHTK-AM (2000–02).
Filled in for Dan Patrick on his radio show broadcast on ESPN Radio weekdays from 1pm - 4pm Eastern time, during the 2005 holiday season.
Filled in occasionally for Mike Golic on the ESPN Radio show Mike and Mike in the Morning.
Now works for CBS Sports and CBS Sports Network. She's a regular contributor on the NFL Today, and host on CBS's We Need To Talk.
In October 2018 she was honored by the Michigan Jewish Sports Foundation as one of their Hall of Fame inductees.

Personal life

On the October 11, 2018, edition of CBS This Morning, host Gayle King announced that Jacobson was engaged. According to 98.5 radio in Boston (The Sports Hub), Jacobson got engaged to Boston Celtics play-by-play announcer Sean Grande. They were married on September 28, 2019.

Controversy
At a private roast for co-workers Mike Greenberg and Mike Golic in January 2008, Jacobson cursed the University of Notre Dame's Touchdown Jesus. Jacobson and ESPN both released a statement apologizing to those offended by the roast comments. Jacobson was suspended from ESPN for one week. Upon returning, she apologized on-air for her behavior and comments.

Awards
 Edward R. Murrow Award (2000)
 National Headliner Award (1998)

References

External links

Dana Jacobson ESPN Bio
Chicago Tribune on Jacobson

1971 births
20th-century American Jews
20th-century American journalists
21st-century American Jews
21st-century American journalists
American television sports announcers
ESPN people
Living people
National Basketball Association broadcasters
People from Bloomfield Hills, Michigan
People from West Des Moines, Iowa
Television anchors from Sacramento, California
University of Michigan College of Literature, Science, and the Arts alumni
Women sports announcers